Malachi Ritscher (Mark David Ritscher; January 13, 1954 – November 3, 2006) was an American musician, recording engineer, human rights activist, and anti-war protester. He gained fame through his self-immolation, an act of protest against the 2003 invasion of Iraq.

Biography
Mark David Ritscher was born in Dickinson, North Dakota on January 13, 1954. Ritscher and his family moved around the United States until 1969, when they moved to Lincoln, Nebraska, where he attended high school.  Ritscher married at age 17, had a son named Malachi, and after almost ten years, divorced. In 1981 Ritscher moved to Chicago and adopted the name Malachi for himself. He played bass on a 1988 EP by Arsenal, a recording project of Big Black guitarist Santiago Durango. (The credit on the EP reads "Malachi Richter".) In the 1990s he became a fixture on Chicago's jazz and experimental music scenes, attending and recording many performances. Ritscher, after recording a live concert, would offer his high-quality recording to the musicians at little or no cost. Many of these recordings have seen official release. Near the end of his life Ritscher traveled extensively. He also developed a strong commitment to anti-war issues; Chicago police arrested him twice at anti-war protests.

Suicide 
Ritscher's self-immolation took place on the side of the Kennedy Expressway near downtown Chicago during the morning rush hour of Friday November 3, 2006. In a suicide letter published on his website, he described at length his political convictions as to the Iraq War and his choice to take his own life, writing, "if I am required to pay for your barbaric war, I choose not to live in your world."

Reaction to death
Ritscher's self-immolation went unremarked by the media for nearly a week. It was condemned by Chicago Sun-Times columnist Richard Roeper, who thought that his suicide was a pointless act. "With all great respect, if he thought setting himself on fire and ending his life in Chicago would change anyone's mind about the war in Iraq, his last gesture on this planet was his saddest and his most futile." Ritscher's son described his father as a recovering alcoholic who fought with depression. Other members of Ritscher's family instead believed that Ritscher killed himself to shock an apathetic public into action against the war and world oppression.

Ritscher himself gave detailed reasons for his suicide: "My position is that I only get one death, I want it to be a good one. Wouldn't it be better to stand for something or make a statement, rather than a fiery collision with some drunk driver? Are not smokers choosing death by lung cancer? Where is the dignity there? Are not the people who disregard the environment killing themselves and future generations?" In his self-penned obituary he confessed to feeling guilty for not killing Defense Secretary Donald Rumsfeld when he had the chance.

Ska-punk band Less Than Jake wrote a song about Ritscher's death titled "Malachi Richter's Liquor's Quicker" for their 2008 album GNV FLA.  Ritscher's name was intentionally misspelled as Richter in reference to his credit on the 1988 Arsenal EP he'd played bass on which his name had been similarly misspelled.  The opening of the song includes the reading of an excerpt from his suicide note with Morse code underneath that says "We may lose hope but there’s always hope."

David Lester, guitarist in Mecca Normal, designed a poster of Malachi as one of his Inspired Agitator series in 2008. Mecca Normal recorded a song in 2010 called "Malachi" for a 7" on K Records. The song was engineered by Calvin Johnson.

The section "Objection: 'Compositions/Improvisations'" in the 2011 book Howell by poet Tyrone Williams features poems whose titles are also the titles of live jazz albums recorded by Ritscher, and is dedicated to Ritscher.  The section also quotes Ritscher's suicide note in full, and mentions Thich Quang Duc.

See also
Self-immolations in protest to the Vietnam War

References

External links
Obituary - self-written
Mission statement
Malachi Ritscher's apparent suicide from the Chicago Reader; with hundreds of comments from friends, family, and others
I Heard You, Malachi: Grassroots campaign raising awareness of Malachi (linked from the Internet Archive)
 Chicago anti-war protesters remember Malachi at the site of his immolation
Chicago anti-war musician burns himself to death in rush hour traffic from Indymedia
Malachi Ritscher: A Martyr For Peace from the Chicago Independent Media Center
 video of a tribute song by Canadian indie rock duo Mecca Normal
"A letter, a will and a friend left coping with suicide" from the Milwaukee Journal Sentinel; includes quotes from Bruno Johnson
[ Malachi Ritscher music credits] from Allmusic
Malachi Ritscher 1954-2006 Pitchfork Media Feature
Obscured: The Self-Immolation of Malachi Ritscher An editorial featured in the University of Illinois at Chicago Chicago Flame newspaper
War protester's suicide prompts question Ashley M. Herer, Associated Press, Nov. 26, 2006
The quiet death of Mr Ritscher, The Guardian, Nov. 28, 2006
Anti-war protester burns himself to death in vain- Police told that a statue was on fire 
Public Radio's Weekend America covered the story, A Protest Delayed, December 2, 2006
War protester's fiery suicide probed - U.S. Life - nbcnews.com
"I heard you, Malachi" - Song About Malachi Ritscher
"Malachi Ritscher" - Memorial
"I Heard You, Malachi Ritscher" - Short film from Chicago Independent Television

2006 suicides
1954 births
Suicides by self-immolation
People from Dickinson, North Dakota
Protests against the Iraq War
Suicides in Illinois
Deaths from fire in the United States
2006 deaths